The Anchor Palace, originally known as the Sailer-Kudelich Palace, is a historical monument in Timișoara, Romania. It stands in the Iosefin district, at the intersection of General Ion Dragalina Boulevard and Tudor Vladimirescu Embankment, along the Bega Canal. It got its name from the anchor exposed on its facade, reminiscent of naval trade on Bega.

History 
The area on the left bank of the Bega Canal, near the current Stephen the Great Bridge, was initially known as Zum Grünen Anger. The current name of the palace is a linguistic confusion: Anger is an archaic word of German origin meaning "small meadow", while Anker means "anchor". The plot of land was used for gardening and belonged to the Sailer family. On the corner where the palace stands today, a small building was built where the Navigation Office of the Commercial Port of Timișoara operated for a while. Later, the Golden Anchor restaurant was opened there, which was a popular meeting palace for families and advertised itself as the "most pleasant entertainment place". A heiress granddaughter of German philanthropist  married Aladár Kuderlich, former director of the Hungarian Credit Bank, Elisabetin branch. In 1902 Kuderlich built on the site of the restaurant the palace known as Kuderlich Palace or Kuderlich-Sailer Palace. The building housed spacious three-, four- and five-room apartments, which were already connected to water, gas and electricity when they were handed over. A restaurant continued to operate on the ground floor of the palace, the confusion with the restaurant's company being accepted in the name Anchor Palace, and the decorative motif of the anchor was used on the palace.

Architecture 
The building is located on the banks of the Bega Canal, on the eastern corner of the intersection between General Ion Dragalina Boulevard and Tudor Vladimirescu Embankment. It is a large building, with commercial premises on the ground floor, and residences on the two floors. The building permit was issued on 24 August 1901, and the building was completed on 7 July 1902. It is considered one of the first palaces designed by German architect .

The style is historicist with neo-Romanesque and neo-Gothic decorations, having oversized gables, and the corner tower with its circular section and conical roof is of medieval inspiration.

References 

Buildings and structures in Timișoara
1902 establishments in Romania
Buildings and structures completed in 1902
Historic monuments in Timiș County